The , also marketed prominently as the Mazda 323, Mazda Protegé and  Mazda Allegro, is a small family car that was manufactured by Mazda between 1963 and 2003. The Familia line was replaced by the Mazda3/Axela for 2004.

It was marketed as the Familia in Japan, which means "family" in Latin. For export, earlier models were sold with nameplates including: "800", "1000", "1200", and "1300". In North America, the 1200 was replaced by the Mazda GLC, with newer models becoming "323" and "Protegé". In Europe, all Familias sold after 1977 were called "323".

The Familia was also rebranded as the Ford Laser and Ford Meteor in Asia, Oceania, Southern Africa, some Latin American countries and, from 1991, as the Ford Escort and Mercury Tracer in North America. In addition, the Familia name was used as the Mazda Familia Wagon/Van, a badge-engineered version of the Nissan AD wagon (1994–2017) and Toyota Probox (2018–present).

Mazda Familias were manufactured in the Hiroshima Plant and also assembled from "knock-down kits" in various countries including Taiwan, Indonesia, Malaysia, South Africa, Zimbabwe, Colombia, and New Zealand. Some of these plants kept manufacturing the Familia long after it was discontinued at home.



First generation (1963–1968) 

Mazda's automotive plans for the early sixties consisted of growing alongside the Japanese economy. To achieve this goal, they began by building an extremely affordable kei car, the R360 in 1960, planning on introducing gradually larger and pricier cars as the Japanese customers became able to afford them. As a preview, testing the waters, a larger "Mazda 700" prototype was shown at the eighth Tokyo Motor Show in 1961, and formed the basis for the upcoming Mazda Familia. Meanwhile, the four door version of the R360 was introduced as the Mazda Carol, which appeared in 1962, and discontinued in 1964.

The first production Familia, styled by a young Giorgetto Giugiaro while working at Carrozzeria Bertone, appeared in October 1963. In line with Mazda's policy of only gradually approaching the production of private cars (a luxury in Japan at the time), the first Familia was initially only available as a commercial two-door wagon called the Familia van. The van was joined in April 1964 by a plusher Familia wagon, in October by a four-door sedan, and in November by a two-door sedan. The "flat deck" design of the sedan versions was reportedly inspired by the Chevrolet Corvair. Private car versions received foglights in the grille as well as more chrome trim. The Familia was sold in other markets as the 800.

The Familia was introduced to the Japanese market in time for the 1964 Summer Olympics which began in October.

The cars used a 782 cc, "SA" four-stroke aluminum straight-four engine, also known as the "white engine". There was also a pickup version available from November 1964, a box truck was added in early or mid 1965.

A new Familia 1000 coupé arrived in November 1965, with a 985 cc SOHC "PC" engine, and was joined by the larger Mazda Luce in 1966. Around the same time, the 800 engine was upgraded, adding three horsepower. As a number of new 1-liter vehicles were introduced by Mazda's competitors, another 987 cc OHV engine (PB) appeared in January 1967, powering new 1000 sedan and van versions. The 1-liter sedans and vans are recognizable by their broader, rounded-off rectangular headlights. Production of the sedan continued until November 1967, while the van versions continued until they were replaced in February 1968.
Around 400,000 of the first Familias were built, 130,473 of which were sedans and coupés. Around 10,000 of the first generation Familias were exported, mainly to Australia and Oceania.

Data
Primary sources below are listed at the head of each column, information sourced elsewhere is referenced directly in the relevant cells. Data is for models as marketed in the Japanese domestic market.

Second generation (FA2/FA3 series 1; 1967–1977)

1967–1970 (FA2)

The new Familia appeared in November 1967 with the same pushrod 987 cc engine as used in the previous generation sedans. It was sold as the "Mazda 1000" in some markets. In July 1968 the rotary-engined version (R100) was introduced, along with a new coupé bodywork which was also available with the 1200 cc piston engine. After an April 1970 facelift (called the "Familia Presto" in the domestic Japanese market), the slightly different OHC "PC" 1-liter engine was also offered. A larger 1169 cc straight-four engined version came along in February 1968, becoming the "Mazda 1200" for export. In this form, the car was first exhibited in Europe at the 1968 Paris Motor Show in the autumn of that year. Power outputs (SAE gross) in Japan of the facelifted, overhead-cam-engined versions were  respectively. The Van (wagon) model was available with either three or five doors, although most export markets only received the five-door version.

1970–1973 (Familia Presto FA3 series 1)

From April 1970, the Presto nameplate was added into the entire Familia range, "Presto" means "quick" in Italian. Brand new overhead camshaft 1.3-liter TC engine also appeared, derived from the smaller 1.0-liter OHC engine already seen in the first generation Familia coupé. At the same time, the range received a light facelift including a chrome strip around the front grille. Unlike the truck, the vans also used the "Familia Presto" name. Chassis codes are SPCV for the 1.0-litre and STBV for the 1.3-litre, with power outputs as for the sedan/coupé. Standard and Deluxe versions were available, with the Deluxe also offering five-door bodywork.

The Familia was exported as the "Mazda 1300", and replaced the previous generation 1200 model in most markets. In Finland, the Familia Presto was marketed as the "Mazda Marella." The sedan and coupé were updated in 1972 in Japan and in the autumn of 1973 for export market, but the truck and wagon/van versions continued with little change. The vans and pickup trucks actually soldiered on until 1978, by which time a wagon version of the succeeding FA4 Familia (323/GLC) had been introduced.

The pickup models were built until 1991 for markets such as South Africa, Zimbabwe, and the Philippines.
In South Africa, the little bakkie was sold as the "Mazda F-1000" or "F-1300". In Thailand, a version of the pickup was produced in small numbers until the late 1990s as the Familia Super Cab.

Engines (export power outputs, DIN):
 1968–1973 – 1.0 L (985 cc) PB I4,  / 
 1968–1970 – 1.2 L (1169 cc) TB I4,  / 
 1970–1973 – 1.3 L (1272 cc) TC I4, 2-barrel,  / 

The pickup received the BPB55, BTA55/65, or FA2T55/65/66 model codes respectively when fitted with the OHV 1.0 or 1.2, or the OHC 1.3. All three models were available as either Standard or Deluxe. The 1000 Van (Japanese terminology for the station wagon, which was intended for commercial use there) received either BPCV or BPBV chassis codes, signifying three- or five-door versions. The Familia Presto Van, with OHC engines, received chassis numbers MP3xV/SP3xV for the 1000 (3-door/5-door) and MT2xV/ST2xV for the 1200. The five-door Van range was gradually expanded downwards as the three-door models dropped in popularity. The Familia Presto Van continued largely unchanged until the summer of 1978, aside from the 1.3 losing two horsepower along the way.

The "1200" was offered in the United States in 1971 and again for the 1973 model year. US-market models had round sealed-beam headlamps mounted in pill-shaped bezels fitting the original openings. The 1971 version was the first piston-powered Familia sold in the United States and arrived in two- and four-door forms alongside its rotary Mazda R100 coupé counterpart. It was replaced by the somewhat larger 808 (Grand Familia) the next year. The 1200 model returned for 1973 as the base-model economy Mazda. The company then focused on performance for the next two years, dropping the economy car. After the gas crisis they returned to the economy sector with the Mizer in 1976, a rebadged 808/818.

Engine (US):
 1971, 1973 – 1.2 L (1169 cc) I4,  /

Familia Rotary/R100 

In July 1968 Mazda added a Familia Rotary model to the range, offered in both two-door coupé and four-door sedan variants. Sedan models were given an additional "SS" nameplate. The Familia Rotary was powered by a 982 cc 10A rotary engine and the coupé version was sold outside Japan as the "Mazda R100". After an April 1970 update (known colloquially in Australia as the Series 2) it was known as the "Familia Presto Rotary" in Japan as the Presto nameplate was added into the entire Familia range. Power was rated at just  due to a small carburetor (thus the "R100" name). The rotary engined R100 has a unique front end design, with a more prominent pointed hood, grille, and bumper. The rear also gained its own design with twin round tail lights, which became for a time a signature design element for the rotary engined versions of Mazda's cars. Inside, the cars were more sumptuously appointed with plusher seats and chrome plated accents, full sized interior door trim panels, a floor mounted handbrake lever, and a unique cockpit styled dashboard with full instrumentation. Mazda referred to this dashboard as the "T-Dash", and fitted it to top spec piston engined variants of the Familia on the Japanese market as well as the rotary models.

In Japan, the installation of a rotary engine gave Japanese buyers a financial advantage when it came time to pay the annual road tax in that they bought a car that was more powerful than a traditional inline engine, but without having the penalty for having an engine in the higher 1.0-litre tax bracket. This was the only generation of the Familia that had the rotary engine offered. When Mazda updated the rotary engine to single distributor design in late 1973 with a raft of improvements to improve reliability and fuel economy, the smaller 10A engine was discontinued. Upgrading the Familia Rotary to the 12A engine would have cost the car its tax advantage in Japan, and the decision to discontinue it was made, despite the Familia body continuing production for some years to follow.

The R100 was one of the first Mazda cars imported into the United States for the new Mazda Motors of America, sold in model years 1971 and 1972. Due to US regulations it was released in North America with round headlights fitted in place of the rectangular lights fitted in all other markets. It was a surprising hit with the American public, though sales were limited to some Northwestern states initially.

Following on the success of the Cosmo Sports at Nürburgring in 1968, Mazda decided to race another rotary car. The Familia Rotary coupé won its first outing, at the Grand Prix of Singapore, in April 1969. Next, the company took on the touring car endurance challenge at Spa, the Spa 24 Hours. For 1969, Mazda entered a pair of Familia Rotary coupés. The cars came fifth and sixth the first year after a quartet of Porsche 911s. The Familia also placed fifth at the Marathon de la Route at Nürburgring in 1969, the same race that the Cosmo had bowed at the previous year. Finally, Mazda took the Familia home for the Suzuka All-Japan Grand Cup, where it won easily. For 1970, the Familia placed eighth at the RAC Tourist Trophy in June, followed by a fourth place at the West German Touring Car race in July. At Spa, four Familias were present, battling with BMW Alpinas, and Alfa Romeos for the podium. This time, three of the Mazdas retired, with the fourth claiming the fifth position. Mazda also turned its attention to Le Mans in 1970 with rotary-powered prototypes. The company finally won that race 21 years later with the 787B.

Kia Brisa 

From October 1974 until 1981, Kia Motors manufactured a pick up variant of the second generation Familia as the "Kia Brisa" at their first integrated automobile manufacturing facility, the Sohari Plant in Gwangmyeong, South Korea. Production originally commenced in 1973 in the form of the Brisa B-1000 pickup truck, but passenger car production (originally as the "Brisa S-1000") only commenced later. Brisa comes from the Spanish/Portuguese word for "breeze". The Brisa was equipped with a  1.0-liter Mazda engine, a bigger 1.3-liter engine was later added to the line up. Production came to an end after the new military dictator Chun Doo-hwan enforced industry consolidation, meaning Kia had to give up passenger cars and focus entirely on light trucks.

The original version of the Brisa received a slightly different front end from the original Familia, featuring twin headlights. Later, single headlights were used. In total, 31,017 Brisa passenger cars were built. Including the pickups increases the totals to 75,987, of which a total of 1,526 were exported. Exports, Kia's first, began with a shipment of 31 Brisa B-1000 pickups to Qatar in 1975. The Brisa (along with the pickup model, called "Master") was also exported to Colombia and Greece

Mazda Grand Familia/Savanna/808/818/RX-3 

In September 1971, Mazda introduced the "Mazda Grand Familia" and the Mazda Savanna to better compete with the Toyota Corolla, and the Nissan Sunny in North America. The Grand Familia/Savanna was intended to replace the smaller Familia. But with the advent of the 1970s energy crisis, the Familia began to experience an increase in sales due to better fuel economy, so the Familia remained in Japan and Europe, and Mazda decided to offer the Grand Familia and Savanna as larger, performance enhanced alternatives. It is better known by its export market names Mazda 808, 818, and RX-3. The Grand Familia was also built by Kia with the 1272 cc engine from October 1975, originally as the Brisa II and later as the K303.

Third generation (FA3 series 2; 1973–1977) 

The third generation Familia was announced in September 1973, a month before the 1973 oil crisis. It was basically an updated version of the 1970 Familia Presto, reintroduced with 60 mm wider bodywork and reworked front and rear designs. It was promoted and marketed as the "Widebody" in Japan. These changes were made only to the sedans and coupé, while the second generation van/wagon and trucks remained in production and retaining the original narrower bodywork with minor changes. Familia Presto continued using "Mazda 1000/1300" name in export market, "Mazda Marella" name was also retained in Finland.

The Rotary Presto sedan/coupé was discontinued in Japan, having been replaced by the larger Grand Familia-based Mazda Savannah. The piston-engined 1000/1300 and rotary-engined R100 coupés were also replaced by 808/818/RX-3 coupé for export market. This generation was not available in North America and replaced by the bigger 808/Mizer/RX-3.
Developed to face the global oil crisis, the Presto featured the fuel efficient 985 cc "PC" and 1272 cc "TC" OHC engines from previous Familia Presto.

Production of the third generation Familia ended in January 1977, but not before another minor facelift and emissions scrubbing had taken place in February 1976. This changes were not applied for export market.

Fourth generation (FA4; 1977–1980) 

The Familia AP (323 in most of the world, GLC for "Great Little Car" in North America) debuted in January 1977 as a rear-wheel-drive subcompact, replacing both the Grand Familia (818) and the preceding Familia (1000/1300). There was a choice of hatchbacks and station wagon bodies, both available with a three- or five-door bodystyle. The station wagon version was a bit later, first being introduced in June 1978, which also meant that the commercial versions based on the 1970 Familia could finally be retired. Three Mazda engines were available, the 985 cc PC, 1,272 cc TC, and the 1415 cc UC (introduced in March 1978). The 1.0-liter unit was only made for export markets. The new Familia shared many parts with the older Mazda Grand Familia. This was the first appearance of the 323 name, for export markets only.

The Familia AP was marketed to a new kind of youthful Japanese consumer, and sold very well at home as well as abroad. Nonetheless, the cars traditional rear-wheel-drive underpinnings limited interior space and betrayed themselves in having a very narrow track when compared to the body. The FA4 was somewhat of an interim solution while Mazda worked on a front-wheel-drive car, but still managed to sell around 890,000 examples in its three full years of production.

In June 1979 the 323/Familia underwent a facelift, replacing the previous round headlights with rectangular units which were designed as a single unit along with the grille. The new style was in line with that of the recently released Mazda Capella/626 (CB). Other minor differences occurred along with the facelift.

The range was replaced in 1980, however, the station wagon models continued in production until 1986.

The FA4-series Familia/323 was available in several body variants:
 Five-door four-seat hatchback
 Three-door four-seat hatchback
 Five-door four-seat station wagon (also as a van in Japan)
 Three-door four-seat station wagon
 Three-door two-seat van with an extended roof profile

Several of these were available in multiple trim levels.

Engines:
 1.0 L PC,  /  – export only
 1.3 L TC (1977.01–1980)  /  in Japan
 1.4 L UC (1978.03–1980)  in Japan

In Australia the 1.3 had  at 5700 rpm while the bigger 1.4, introduced in July 1978, offered  at a somewhat lower engine speed of 5500 rpm. The 1.4 was accompanied by the new, better-equipped CS model which was only available with five-door bodywork.

Van engines:
 1.3 L TC (1978.06–1986)  JIS (1979),  JIS (net, later years),  DIN (export models)
 1.4 L UC (1978.06–1986)  JIS (1979),  JIS (net, later years)
 1.5 L E5 (1982.10–1986)  (DIN, wagon/van only)

A five-speed manual gearbox was introduced later as an alternative to the original four-speed manual gearbox. At the same time the original  round sealed beam headlights were replaced with square sealed beam units on all models except the van, together with a general styling and mechanical upgrade. A three-speed automatic gearbox was also available on the bigger engined models, it was first introduced (on the 1400) at the end of June 1978.

When the next generation front-wheel-drive Familia/323/GLC models were released in 1980, the wagon and van models continued unchanged, due to Mazda not developing wagon models for the newer range. A facelift however was given to the wagons in 1981, which gave the models the front clip (albeit with different bumpers) of the front-wheel-drive models. Production of the wagons continued to 1986, when a new front-wheel-drive model was introduced. Originally available with the 1.3- TC and 1.4-liter UC engines, in export markets the larger unit was replaced with the new 1.5-liter E5 engine for the 1983 model year.

North America
For the United States, the GLC, advertised as the Great Little Car, was only offered with one engine at a time. The new GLC overlapped with the old-style Mizer for part of 1977 and was produced through 1980 before being replaced by the next-generation GLC. The marketing campaign in the U.S. had the words "Great Little Car" set to the tune of Spanish Flea. The station wagon continued to be offered until the 1986 model year.

For the 1979 model year, the original  1272 cc four was replaced with a 1415 cc engine producing . In addition to three- and five-door hatchbacks, as well as the wagon, there was also a GLC Sport version which offered a five-speed rather than the four-speed manual or the three-speed automatic installed in other versions.

South Africa
In South Africa, the five-door-only 323 proved an immediate success. The 1.3 was gradually replaced by the larger 1.4 from July 1978, while a Special and a CS model were added at the low and high ends of the lineup respectively, complementing the existing De Luxe models. Well-equipped versions of the 1978 facelift model were sold as the "323 GLC" in South Africa. A 1600 cc model was also available in South Africa – however this model did not have a Mazda engine, unlike the rest of the range. To satisfy that country's local content regulations, a locally built Mitsubishi Saturn 1.6-liter unit was used. This produces  and was the most powerful engine to be installed in the FA-series Familia/323. It arrived in early 1979, but period testers felt that the less revvy 1.6 provided very little that the 1.4 did not offer, and could not be considered to be worth the price. Sigma also fielded a rotary-engined 323 in the South African national rally championship.

Indonesia

In Indonesia the fourth generation Familia was marketed by Indomobil Group twice, the first time as the 323 hatchback from 1977 to 1980, and the second time around as the low-cost alternative of the popular Toyota Kijang and fellow Indomobil Group product's Suzuki Carry Extra/Futura; low-price "Mazda MR90" (hatchback) between December 1990 to 1993, "Mazda Baby Boomers" (hatchback) between 1993 to 1995, and as the "Mazda Vantrend" (station wagon and special limited order as high roof van or pickup truck) between 1993 to 1997. The name MR90 stands for "Mobil Rakyat 90" (people's car for the 1990s) as it was intended to become a national car project. This was scuppered by the appearance of the Timor 515 project. The MR90 and its successors did see limited exports to small markets such as Fiji and Sri Lanka. There was also a better equipped GLX version available. The Baby Boomers was a lightly facelifted variant with new bumpers and a rear spoiler, for a more sporty appearance overall.

The 1990s versions built by Indomobil have modernized headlights (same as on the Mazda 626 (GC), while Vantrend adopted the pre-facelift North American market quad headlights version) and bumpers. Only the  UC 1.4-liter engine was offered, in combination with a five-speed transmission. The project was suggested to and given the green light by Mazda's Senior Managing Director Keiji Asano while he was on a trip to Indonesia in 1986. Sold alongside the seventh generation 323, an MR90 cost less than half the price of the newer model, but still more expensive than Toyota Kijang and Suzuki Carry "minibuses" as the country imposed 30% tax for sedans. In the past hatchback and wagon were classified as sedan Indonesia, but then revised as "minibus" in early 2000s. This changes boosting the sales of  hatchbacks and started the downfall of sedans popularity in Indonesia.

Around this time, a coachbuilder company called PT. Marvia Graha Motor (owned by Marvy Apandi, the executive director of Indomobil Group) built around 50 units replica of Porsche 911 (964) based on MR90 hatchbacks. While retaining the original 1.4-liter engine, 5-speed manual gearbox, suspension and dashboard (later models has 964 dashboard replica), the body was made from fiberglass by using the 964 production tools from VW Group. At that time Indomobil had a trial by assembling two Porsche 964 and planned to build Porsche and Audi in Indonesia to compete with BMW and Mercedes Benz. The plan was terminated because the production quality was below VW Group's standard.

Fifth generation (BD; 1980–1986) 

The BD Familia, first shown on 2 June 1980, was entirely new – it was Mazda's first front-engine, front-wheel-drive subcompact car, and was available as a hatchback and sedan. It was developed with input from Ford, which in 1979 had acquired a stake in the Japanese manufacturer, and had a twin called the Ford Laser (and Ford Meteor, for its four-door sedan model in Australia).

At its introduction in 1980, it won the first Car of the Year Japan Award.

The new Mazda E engine-series, loosely based on the preceding PC/TC/UC series, was developed expressly for the BD and was offered in three different displacements. The smallest 1.1-liter E1 unit was reserved for certain export markets where the tax structures suited it. Chassis codes were BD1011/BD1031/BD1051 depending on the engine installed.

Engines:
  E1, 1 barrel,  / 
  E3, 2 barrel,  / 
  E5, 2 barrel,  / 
  E5S, 2x2 barrel,  / 
The most powerful version was marketed as the "323 GT" in European markets. The Familia/323 underwent a facelift in January 1983.

For the Japanese market other top end models were offered, originally the three-door Familia XGI with a 1,500 cc single cam, multi-point fuel-injected engine. In June 1983 the turbocharged XGI Turbo was added, Mazda's first turbocharged piston engine. It had a particularly small turbocharger, for better low-end response. Period commentators complimented its linear and smooth power delivery. The Familia sedan and their twin, the Ford Laser S, was also offered with the same specifications but in limited numbers. Claimed outputs in the Japanese market were considerably higher than in export countries, due to the differing JIS standard rather than DIN. Period sources suggest subtracting ten percent from the JIS numbers.

This particular Familia was a strong comeback for Mazda in the Japanese market, even outselling the Toyota Corolla on several occasions. The four-door sedan was equipped with a reverse-rake front grille and lights in the Japanese market, to make it appear more "senior". The same front design was used for the GA/GB Ford Meteor.

The 1980 Familia/323 was the first front-engine, front-wheel-drive vehicle from Mazda since the R130. This generation of 323 was Wheels magazine's car of the year for 1980. The existing station wagon version, simply a facelifted version of the previous rear-drive model (fitted with the square headlights and grille from the new model), was sold in parallel with the BD. The wagon was available with either three or five doors and was equipped either with the old 1272 cc TC engine or the 1415 cc UC. The 1.4 was replaced from 1983 with the newly developed 1490 cc E5 engine. The TC 1.3 produces  while the larger versions offer .

Export markets
The front-wheel-drive 323 was introduced in Europe in September 1980, nearly simultaneously to its cousin and competitor the Ford Escort. The four-door sedan version followed in January 1981, and one month later automatic-equipped models became available to European buyers.

GLC (1981–1985) 

The equivalent American Mazda GLC (Great Little Car) appeared in the 1981 model year, although the rear-wheel drive wagon also continued to be offered. It was only offered with a single engine – the twin-barrel 1.5-liter with —and lasted through 1985, after which it was replaced by the next-generation Mazda 323. With this, the GLC nameplate was retired. The BD was the only front-wheel drive Mazda vehicle using the GLC name. Originally it was offered with three- or five-door bodywork, in standard, Custom, Custom L, or Sport equipment levels. The five-door only came as a Custom and was sold only in Hawaii and Puerto Rico. All cars received exposed rectangular sealed-beam units. The later four-door sedan, introduced for 1983, was available in Custom, Custom L, and Sport models.

The Sport received blacked out trim, a steering wheel borrowed from the RX-7, full instrumentation, and a special rear interior which closely integrates the side trim with the rear seat design – an early iteration of a design philosophy taken to its extreme with the 1988 Persona and the 1990 Eunos Cosmo. Unlike the sporting 323s in other markets, the Sport only received special hubcaps, rather than alloy wheels. For 1982, the Sport was made to live up to its name a little bit more, with the installation of a front anti-roll bar and cast aluminum wheels. The five-door GLC gained a fully carpeted trunk for 1982.

Sixth generation (BF; 1985–1994) 

In January 1985, the sixth generation Familia/323 was fully renewed. It was available as a hatchback (with three or five doors) or four-door sedan only for the first year; wagon and cabriolet models were added in November 1985 and March 1986 respectively. The wagon was commonly sold as a light van in Japan, but for the first time it was also available as a passenger-oriented wagon model in the Japanese domestic market. In January 1987 a personal coupé version with its own bodywork, the Étude, was added. In February 1987 the Familia range underwent a light facelift that included replacing the old E engines with the more modern B series. In some markets, such as Indonesia, the B engine continued to be installed after the facelift.

This generation of the Familia/323 was also available in a version with a turbocharged DOHC engine, with either front- or four-wheel drive, producing . The 4WD version (sold in either a light-weight GT or fully optioned GT-X grade) introduced in October 1985, saw some success in rally's Group A category. A limited production Japanese-only homologation special, the 4WD GT-Ae, appeared May 1988 and offered an additional ten horsepower and viscous rear limited slip differential (similar to the later BG Familia). Full time four-wheel drive was also available in more pedestrian versions like the 1.5 hatchback.

Introduced in July 1985, it is a naturally aspirated indirect injection engine.

As with the earlier 323 Wagon/Familia Van, the wagon (BW) skipped the succeeding generational change and continued to be available alongside the next generation in most markets. It was later updated with a new grille and lights and continued to be available until 1994/95. When the saloons and hatchbacks received new engines in late 1987, the vans continued to use the old E-series units for a little longer.

A factory-built convertible body was introduced in March 1986 in both Mazda 323 and Ford Laser (323 panels from firewall back) versions, initially running the 1.5-liter turbocharged E5T engine but later switching to the 1.6-liter DOHC B6D.

Engines (Japanese domestic market):
 1985–1987 –  E3, 2 barrel, 8-valve,  Gross / 
 1987–1989 –  B3, 2 barrel, 8-valve,  Net / 
 1985–1987 –  E5, 2 barrel carburettor, 8-valve,  Gross /  Gross – Net rating  / 
 1985–1987 –  E5, EGi, 8-valve,  Gross/ Gross – Net rating  / 
 1985–1987 –  E5T, turbo EGi, 8-valve,  Gross / 
 1987–1989 –  B5, 2 barrel, 12-valve,  Net / 
 1987–1989 –  B6, EGi, 8-valve,  Net / 
 1986–1989 –  B6D, EGi, 16-valve,  Net / 
 1985–1989 –  B6T, turbo EGi, 16-valve,  Net / 
 1985–1989 –  PN, diesel, 8-valve,  Gross /  Gross – Net rating  / , 1987–1989 Net rating:  /

Export markets
The 1985 Familia spawned a Ford Laser twin sold in the Asia-Pacific. The Laser sedan and wagon were nearly identical to the Familia but with a Ford grille. By contrast the Laser hatchback model, which was sold in the U.S. as the Mercury Tracer used completely different panels from the Familia's.

Engines (European models unless otherwise noted):
 1985–1987 –  E1, 2 barrel, 8-valve,  / 
 1985–1987 –  E3, 2 barrel, 8-valve,  /  –  in some markets, 65 PS in Switzerland
 1987–1989 –  B3, 2 barrel, 8-valve,  / 
 1987–1989 –  B5, 2 barrel, 12-valve,  / 
 1985–1989 –  B6, 8-valve,  / 
 1985–1989 –  B6T, turbo, 16-valve,  / 
 1988–1991 –  FE-SOHC, EFi, 8-valve,  /  (South Africa only)
 1991–1994 –  FE-DOHC, EFi, 16-valve,  /  (South Africa only)
 1986–199? –  PN, diesel, 8-valve,  

United States
The new 323 arrived in the United States for the 1986 model year and continued to be available through 1989. The naming practice was now aligned with most of Mazda's export markets, with the 323 badge replacing GLC. For 1987 the wagon version was added to the lineup, with the same mechanicals as the hatchbacks and sedans. In 1988, Mazda added a turbocharged option in the GT and GTX model as well as four-wheel drive in the GTX model. The GTX was the first four-wheel drive passenger car Mazda offered in the United States.

South Africa
The model remained in production in South Africa, as an entry-level model until 2003. It was also sold there as the "Midge", the "Sting", and as the "Ford Tonic". A locally designed pick-up based on the Familia front end, called the Rustler was also produced, and sold as the "Ford Bantam". From 1991 to 1994 Samcor also produced and sold the 323 with the 2.0 L 16-valve DOHC FE engine from the Mazda 626 and badged it "200i". Along with the 2.0 L 16-valve DOHC engine there were upgrades to the suspension and braking system. Still, the 1.6-liter GT-Ae homologation car was more powerful.

This South African built model was also sold in Australia between 1989 and 1991 with minor changes, the most noticeable one being the front indicators having a clear color rather than the normal amber. These models were labeled BF as opposed to the next generation's BG.

Sao Penza
The South African-made model was exported to the United Kingdom between 1991 and 1993 as the "Sao Penza" and fitted with a 1.3-liter fuel-injected engine. The importer was Automotive Holdings, a subsidiary of Mazda Cars Ltd, the official Mazda UK importer. It was a rebadged version of the Mazda 323, imported from South Africa, where the 1985 model was still assembled by Samcor (now Ford Motor Company of South Africa), although it had ceased to be imported to the UK in 1989. Both four-door saloon and five-door hatchback versions were available, with fairly basic specifications.

It went on sale in the United Kingdom in July 1991, with 1200 vehicles expected to be sold that year. Marketed as "Japanese technology you can afford", it was sold at £7,500 – around £2,000 cheaper than the equivalent version of the new Mazda 323. However, it struggled to compete in a segment of the market dominated by South Korean and Eastern European models. Its prices were not low enough to attract strong sales and it was withdrawn from sale in 1993. Just over 1,000 were sold and as of 2019 there is just one MOT'd car left on the road (a blue 1.3L 5-door)  

The car uses the  Mazda B3 four-cylinder engine.

Seventh generation (BG; 1989–1994) 

The seventh generation Familia (BG) included three-door hatchback, five-door fastback, and four-door sedan variants, none of which share any body panels. The new five-door fastback version was called the Familia Astina in Japan and was sold as the 323F or 323 Astina elsewhere. The BF wagon (originally introduced in 1985) was carried over in facelifted form, although Ford marketed a wagon on the new platform as part of the North American Escort line.

The BG Familia was available with front- or all-wheel drive and a 1.3 L, 1.5 L, 1.6 L, or 1.8 L gas or 1.7 L diesel engine. Later, a turbocharged engine was added, especially developed for homologation purposes for the World Rally Championship, Group A category. The four-wheel drive models (including the turbocharged GT-X) were introduced in August 1989. In Japan, the SOHC 1.6 was only available coupled to four-wheel drive. With a carburettor, it offered , the same as the lower-spec 1.5, but with a somewhat larger torque curve. In Europe, only the 1.8 (in naturally aspirated, 106 PS form or either of the turbocharged variants) was offered with four-wheel-drive.

Trim lines in Japan included "Clair", "Interplay", "Supreme", "Pepper", and "GT-X". The Supreme model was only available in saloon form and features the larger bumpers and bootlid-mounted number plate recess of the American market Protegé. Carburetted models were mostly dropped in 1991, replaced by single-point fuel injection.

In North America, the 323 sedan became the Protegé, while the 323 hatchback kept its name. There, and in the Philippines, base (SE/DX), 4WD and top-line LX models were available. The 1990 base model has the SE name and uses the B8 1.8l SOHC engine that has 16 valves and hydraulic lifters. In 1991, the base model name was changed to "DX". 4WD models existed for the 1990 and 1991 model years, with the SOHC engine and rear disc brakes. The LX version of the Protegé included a BP 1.8l DOHC 16-valve engine . LX models also have power windows and door locks and 14-inch wheels. Vented front and solid rear disc brakes, larger front brakes, larger clutch, equal-length driveshafts, dual outlet muffler, body-color door handles and mirrors, fold-down rear center armrest, driver's vanity mirror, and larger stabilizer bars. A sunroof and 14-inch aluminum alloy wheels were options on LX models.

BG models that were assembled in New Zealand came with glass headlights instead of plastic, and a 240 km/h speedometer.

Production of the BG Familia mostly ended on 24 May 1994, although the 1.3-liter hatchback was kept in production until October 1996 as there was originally no 1.3 option in the following generation. In Australia, the BG model continued to be sold until 1996 as a more affordable alternative to the newer BH model.

In China, the BG model was sold as the Haima CA7130 and the CA7160. They were produced from 1998 until 2004. Power came from the 1.3 litre 8A-FE or 1.6-litre B6 sourced from Toyota and Mazda respectively.

Engines (Japan)
 1989–1991 –  B3, 1 barrel, 8-valve,  / 
 1991–1994 –  B3, EGI-S, 8-valve,  / 
 1989–1991 –  B5-M, carburetor, 16-valve,  / 
 1990–1994 –  B5-MI, EGI-S, 16-valve  / 
 1989–1991 –  B5-DE, EFi, 16-valve DOHC,  / 
 1991–1994 –  B5-DE, EFi, 16-valve DOHC,  /  (lower power for AT cars)
 1989–1991 –  B6, 1 barrel, 8-valve,  / 
 1989–1994 –  B6, carburetor, 16-valve, SOHC,  / 
 1989–1994 –  BP, FI, 16-valve DOHC,  / 
 1989–1994 –  BPT, FI, 16-valve DOHC, turbo,  /  (Familia GT-X)
 1991–1994 –  B8, FI, 16-valve SOHC, 
 1992–1993 –  BPD, FI, 16-valve DOHC, turbo,  /  (Familia GT-R & GT-Ae)
 1989–1994 –  PN, Diesel, 8-valve,  /  (European specs)

Familia Infini
The Mazda Familia Infini was produced from 1989 until 1990 as a special Japan only special sport trim line of the four-door Familia. Much of the Infini trim is similar to the American LX version, equipped with the 1.8 DOHC BP-ZE engine and close ratio LSD 5-speed manual transmission. The Infini was upgraded with a viscous limited-slip differential, stiffer suspension package, and bonnet/headlight style similar to the 323 hatchbacks. In 1994, these were facelifts were adopted on all Familia sedan models. The Infini came only in dark green color with unique Infini trim grille, rear spoiler, "lightweight" carpet, without sound deadener, and with Infini (∞) logos on horn button, front grille, wheel caps, and bootlid. There were also unique factory front clear indicators, a Momo steering wheel, BBS 15-inch rims, suede interior with GTX style seat trim, leather gearboot & knob, front and rear strut braces, 22-mm sway bars front and rear, rear tie bar, and a 7,100 rpm redline tachometer, as well as  four-wheel disc brakes. Around 1,000 Infinis were produced, and preceded Mazda's ɛ̃fini Japanese dealership network.

Familia GT-X, GT-R and GT-Ae

The JDM GTX model featured four-wheel drive, viscous limited-slip differentials and a turbocharged 1.8 L BP engine. In the U.S. the Protegé came with a 1.8 L SOHC non-turbocharged engine, along with 4WD. The JDM GT-R rally homologation version was added in 1992, featuring a number of enhancements over the GTX model: an aggressive front bumper, grill and bonnet vents, updated rear bumper, wheel flares, stiffer suspension and anti-roll bars with thicker cross members, and homologated five-stud wheel hubs with larger brakes. The interior was fitted with leather and suede seats, and had the option of replacing the cupholder with a 3-gauge cluster. In addition, the GTR has stronger connecting rods and pistons, larger oil squirters, larger nose crank, larger oil cooler, sodium filled valves, a baffled inlet manifold, larger injectors (from 360cc (black) to 440cc (orange)), removed boost cut, front-mounted intercooler, and an IHI VJ-23 ball bearing water-cooled turbocharger. Both the GTX and GTR models were limited to a top speed of 180 km/h. However, by simply removing a screw on the back of the instrument cluster, labeled 180 km/h, the speed limiter could be removed.

These shared the power output of the GT-R, but were  lighter, fitted with closer ratio gearboxes, and featured a larger top spoiler with a gap between the hatch and the spoiler to direct air to the new lower spoiler. The wiring for ABS, air conditioning, power mirrors, power windows, power locks, and sunroof was removed. Instead of using the GTR's leather interior, the lighter cloth interior of the GTX was used.

Astina/323F 
A sporty, five-door fastback version was called the Familia Astina in Japan. Elsewhere, it was called 323F and 323 Astina. A luxury version was also sold in Japan as the Eunos 100. The car was produced from 1989 until 1994 before being replaced by the Lantis. A key feature of the Astina/F is the distinct front end with its pop-up headlights. There were carbureted or fuel injected SOHC versions available of the 1.5-, 1.6- and 1.8-liter engines, as well as a version of the 1.8 with DOHC and fuel injection. Unlike the standard Familia saloons and three-door hatchback, the Astina never came from the factory with a turbo or with four-wheel drive.

Taillight arrangement varies from market to market, the main difference being the third brake light in the spoiler and two brake lights per cluster (Japanese spec), rather than one.

In the UK the 323F was launched with 1.6L 16v in either LX, GLX or GLXi trim or as 1.8i 16vGT. In Indonesia it is called Astina GT and RX3 (Special model made in Indonesia like as front & rear bumper and side skirt) with BP05 engine 1.8L

Eighth generation (BH; 1994–1998) 

The eighth generation was released for the Japanese domestic market in June 1994 with front-wheel drive. The sedan version was again sold as the "Mazda Protegé" in North America, as the Mazda Artis in some South American markets, as the "Mazda Étude" in South Africa and as Mazda Allegro in Colombia. Originally there was a three-door coupé (323C/Familia Neo) available, but after sluggish sales, a hatchback version based on the facelifted Familia sedan replaced it.

An unusual JDM station wagon model appeared in September 1994, with the discontinuation of the 1985-generation station wagon. The Mazda Familia Van offered after this year was a rebadged Nissan AD/Wingroad/Sunny California, which was essentially the station wagon version of the Nissan Sunny/Sentra/Pulsar (N14). A new model appeared in the same month, when a lean-burn version called the GS-L arrived: its Z5-DEL engine produces , three down on the regular Z5-DE, but gas mileage improved by ten to fifteen percent. Another loan was the 1.7-liter intercooled turbo-diesel engine purchased from Isuzu for use in sedans since October 1994. These models have a prominent hood scoop. At about the same time a all-wheel-drive model was introduced in Japan, either with a 1.6-liter petrol or the Isuzu turbo-diesel. The 4WD cars can be easily identified by having been equipped with the federalized front (but not rear) bumper, including side marker lights.

This generation grew considerably, with the four-door sedan's wheelbase only 5 millimetres short of the then-current Mazda 626, a mid-size car. The car was not originally offered with a 1.3-liter engine in Japan, with the lineup beginning with the bigger 1.5-liter. To close this gap in the lineup, the BG hatchback with the 1.3-liter engine was kept available until October 1996, when the new hatchback model was introduced (323P) and the smaller engine was made available.

The rare North American ES model came with the Miata (NA)'s 1.8-liter twin-cam engine (though the internals were not entirely the same), all-wheel disc brakes, and dual stabilizer bars. The same car went on sale in Australia in the second half of 1994 with a fully featured BP-ZE engine. The Protegé became classified as a "compact car" for the 1995 model year in North America.

A version with Mazdaspeed accessories was released in Japan and Philippines. It came equipped with Mazdaspeed wrap around bodykit, Mazdaspeed rear spoiler, Momo steering wheel, 15-inch Rota Astral wheels wrapped in 195/55R15 Bridgestone Potenza RE01 tires, Mazdaspeed strut tower bar, Eibach springs, gas-charged shock absorbers, swaybars and Mazdaspeed exhaust made by Yumex.

The Familia/Protegé/323 was facelifted in October 1996, with a newer somewhat calmer style. This generation was discontinued in 1998 in most markets, but continued to be available in some markets until 1999 or 2000. For example, the 3-door hatchback was available in Europe until October 2000.

Models
 Four-door sedan (called the Protegé in North America, 323S in Europe, 323 Protegé in Australia, 323 Lantis/Familia in Indonesia, Allegro in Colombia, Artis in Chile and Étude in South Africa)
 Three-door coupé hatchback (Familia Neo in Japan, 323C in Europe and 323 Neo in Canada)
 Three-door hatchback (called the 323P in Europe)

Familia Neo/323C/323 Neo 
The Familia Neo started production for the Japanese domestic market in 1994 (axed in 1996), and was also sold as the 323C in Europe and the 323 Neo in Canada. Ford released a rebadged version which was mechanically the same although different bumpers, headlights and bonnet were fitted, badged as the Ford Laser Lynx in Japan and Australia, and the Ford Aztec in Taiwan. This model was only available as the Ford Laser-Lynx in the Australian market, as Mazda already had the 323 Astina Hatch filling the gap for a hatchback in the Mazda range. To contradict this, Mazda Australia also offered two 323 sedans, the Astina/Lantis hardtop and the 323 Protegé until production of both models ceased in 1998.

It featured a rear hatch with a divided glass, much like the Honda CR-X. Aesthetically the Familia Neo was very close in looks to a Mazda Lantis/323F and equated to a three-door version and also shared the Lantis suspension. It was also sold for a single year (1995) in Canada as 323 Neo GS. In Europe it was named Mazda 323C (for coupé), available for sale until September 1998 and it was equipped with 1.3 L SOHC, 1.5 L DOHC 16V, and 1.8 L DOHC 16V engine.

Engines
Petrol:
1.3 L (1,323 cc) B3-ME, I4 16-valve SOHC, FI,  /  (1994–2000) 
1.5 L (1,489 cc) Z5-DE, I4 16-valve DOHC, FI,  /  (1994–2000)
1.5 L (1,489 cc) Z5-DEL, I4 16-valve DOHC, FI, lean burn,  /  (1996–1998)
1.5 L (1,498 cc) B5-ZE, I4 16-valve DOHC, FI,  /  (1994–1996)
1.6 L (1,597 cc) B6D, I4 16-valve DOHC, FI,  /  (1996–1998)
1.8 L (1,839 cc) BP-ZE, I4 16-valve DOHC, FI,  /  (1995–2000)
Diesel:
1.7 L (1,686 cc) 4EE1-T, I4 8-valve SOHC, turbo-diesel,  /  (1995–1998)
2.0 L (1,998 cc) RF, I4 8-valve SOHC,  /  (1996–1999)

Lantis/Astina/323F 

A five-door hatchback and four-door sedan, both featuring pillarless doors and distinct sheetmetal from other 323s, was sold in Japan as the Mazda Lantis, in Australia, New Zealand and South Africa as the Mazda 323 Astina, in Colombia as the Mazda Allegro and in Europe as the Mazda 323F.

They were built on platforms distinct from the other 323s and actually appeared nearly a year before the new Familia, in September 1993. The bodyshape was designed by former Porsche designers. The Lantis was on the CB, a minor update of the CA that underpinned the luxury Mazda Xedos 6 and Eunos 500. The European 323F was designated BA, but was actually almost identical to the CB, and had little to do with other B platforms. These models were sold with the 1.5 L 1.6L and 1.8 L engines seen in the rest of the 323 range, as well as a 2.0 L (KF) V6 shared with the Eunos 500. The 2.0L V6 still remains one of the smallest V6 engines put into a production car.

Ninth generation (BJ; 1998–2003) 
{{Infobox automobile
| name = Ninth generation (BJ)
| image = 1999 Mazda Protegé LX in Highlight Silver Metallic, Front Left, 12-07-2022.jpg
| caption = 1999 Mazda Protegé LX (Canada; pre-facelift)
| aka = 
| production = 
| assembly = 
| designer = Tsutomu Toyoda (1996)
| body_style = 
| layout = Front-engine, front-wheel-drive
| platform = Mazda BJ platform
| related = Haima 3
| engine = {{ubl|
  | Gasoline:
  | 1.3 L B3-ME SOHC I4
  | 1.5 L ZL-DE DOHC I4
  | 1.5 L ZL-VE S-VT I4
  | 1.6 L ZM-DE DOHC I4
  | 1.8 L FP-DE DOHC I4
  | 2.0 L FS-DE DOHC I4
  | 2.0 L FS-DET turbo DOHC I4
  | Diesel:
  | 2.0 L RF TD I4
  | China:
  | 1.3 L HA-1.3 I4 (Haima Happin)
  | 1.5 L HA-VVT-1.5 I4 (Haima Happin)
  | 1.6 L HM479Q-BA I4 (Haima Happin)
  | 1.6 L 4G18 I4 (Haima Happin)
  | 1.6 L HA-VVT-1.6 I4 (Haima Family)
  | 1.6 L Tritec I4 (Haima Family)
  }}
| transmission = 
| wheelbase = 
| length = 1999–2000 Protegé: 2001–03 Protegé: Protegé5: 2001–03: 1999–2000: 2001–03 Sedan, 2004–2011 Haima Happin: 1999–2000 Sedan: Mazdaspeed & MP3: Haima Family 2006–2010: 
| width =  (Int'l) (Japan, 2007–2012 Haima Happin, 2010 Haima Family)
| height = Sedan: Wagon: Mazdaspeed & MP3:  (Haima Happin 2012)
}}

A redesigned ninth generation BJ Familia was introduced on 9 June 1998 and released on 29 September 1998 as a 1999 model. Body styles included a four-door sedan, five-door S-Wagon (sold as the Protegé5 in the United States and Canada, and Astina NU in some Asian countries) and a three-door hatchback. In Japan there was also a traditional five-door Wagon sold, but this car is simply a rebadged Nissan. A 4EC automatic transmission and two five-speed manual transmissions were available. All-wheel drive is optional.

The 1999 BJ platform was updated with a four-door sedan or five-door hatchback chassis based on the larger Mazda Capella and offered with more engine choices. The Japanese Mazda Familia had all-wheel drive as an option. In North America, the ES's engine was still 1.8 liters, but for the eighth generation it was a smaller version of the 626's engine (the FP) rather than the sportier engine shared with the Miata which had been used previously. The rear disc brakes of the ES were downgraded to drums.

Mazda 323s were used as police cars by some police departments such as the Singapore Police Force under Fast Response Car (FRCs) until they were retired in 2016.

The Familia Van and Familia Business Wagon were introduced for 2000, and continued to be supplied by Nissan under an OEM deal, based on the Wingroad.

Facelift

In 2001, the entire line was facelifted with new styling, a revised suspension, and a new audio system. For North America, ES models received rear disc brakes and a stiffer suspension. The 1.8 L engine was increased to 2.0 L for the ES models, and was optional on the LX model, becoming the 2.0LX. The standard 2001 Protegé LX engine was the carryover 1.6 L ZM-DE.

A 2.0 L gas engine appeared in 2001 on the Japanese market Sport 20. In 1999, Ford of Japan ceased to market Mazda-based models, and the Ford Laser, along with the Ixion, Telstar and Festiva, was discontinued.

Mazdaspeed Protegé
The MP3 also came from the factory with a complete 450-watt Kenwood powered MP3 stereo with  powered subwoofer. A total of 1,500 were produced – 1,000 finished in blue, and 500 painted yellow.

2001 saw the North American introduction of the hatchback, called Protegé5 with the same 2.0 L engine offering  /  this year and a slightly revised interior. In 2002, most Protegés (including the 5) received the 2.0 L engine, although the SE in Canada had the 1.6 L.

In 2003, Mazdaspeed introduced the Mazdaspeed Protegé, an update to the Protegé MP3 that had a  /  turbocharged engine, shared the MP3's full Racing Beat suspension, redesigned  wheels, larger four-wheel disc brakes, and a Kenwood stereo system that included an amplifier along with a rear-deck mounted  sub. Mazda then followed with a mid year change dubbed the "2003.5." This model included a different aero-kit, the same  Racing Hart wheels, but with a darker color, and custom interior pieces. In total, there were 4,500 Mazdaspeed Protegé models produced of which 1,750 were painted Black/Orange for first version and 2,750 of the mid-year model that were finished in Yellow/Titanium/Blue/Silver.

The 2003 ES model received a tiptronic automatic transmission as an option, as well as a new wheel design appearing on models with the  alloy rim option. This was also the last year of production for the Protegé.

Post-2003
Production ended on 2 October 2003 and the whole Familia line were replaced by the Mazda3 in the same month. The eighth generation Familia continued to be produced by Ford Lio Ho in Taiwan as the "Mazda Isamu Genki" until 2008 (sold as hatch and sedan and with little or no styling differences to the original 1998 production model). It was also badged as the "Ford Activa", which, unlike the Ford Laser, had no styling changes from the 323, except for the badges. In Southeast Asia, a version of the last Laser continued to be assembled in Indonesia, Malaysia, and the Philippines as the Ford Lynx.

This generation remained in production in some South American countries (Ecuador, Colombia, and Venezuela), badged as the Mazda Allegro. Each Allegro keep in the styling of the last generation 323/Protegé/Astina/Familia. In Colombia, production of the Mazda 323 continued until 2003, built by its local subsidiary, the Compañía Colombiana Automotriz.

Chinese company FAW Haima Automobile Co., Ltd. produces a restyled version of the Familia/323 called Haima Family. It is equipped with a 1.6 L gasoline engine mated with a five-speed manual or a four-speed automatic gearbox. Another version called the Haima Happin went on sale for the 2010–2012 model years. The Happin was equipped with a 1.3 L engine and a five-speed manual gearbox.

Engines (includes all models from 1998 to 2003)
 1.3 L B3-ME SOHC I4
 1.5 L ZL-DE DOHC I4
 1.5 L ZL-VE S-VT I4
 1.6 L ZM-DE DOHC I4
 1.8 L FP-DE DOHC I4
 2.0 L FS,  / 
 2.0 L FS-ZE (2001 Sport 20'')
 2.0 L RF Diesel

Gallery

References

External links

Familia
Familia
Cars introduced in 1963
1970s cars
1980s cars
1990s cars
2000s cars
Compact cars
Coupés
Front-wheel-drive vehicles
Hatchbacks
Police vehicles
Rally cars
Rear-wheel-drive vehicles
Sedans
Station wagons
Subcompact cars
Touring cars